Waylander may refer to:

Waylander (band), a Celtic metal band from Northern Ireland
Waylander (novel), a fantasy novel by David Gemmell
Waylander the Slayer, the protagonist in the fantasy novel by David Gemmell